Chal, or shubat, is a Turkic (especially Turkmen, Uzbek and Kazakh) beverage of fermented camel milk, sparkling white with a sour flavor, popular in Central Asia — particularly in Kazakhstan, Uzbekistan and Turkmenistan. In Kazakhstan the drink is known as shubat, and is a staple summer food. Due to preparation requirements and  perishable nature, chal has proved difficult to export. Agaran (fermented cream) is collected from the surface of chal.

Description
Fermented chal is reputed to possess virucidal and virus inhibiting properties not found in fresh camel or cow milk, both in its liquid and lyophilized form — a characteristic which is (reputedly) unaffected by shelf life.

Chal is typically prepared by first souring camel milk in a skin bag or ceramic jar by adding previously soured milk. For 3–4 days, fresh milk is mixed in; the matured chal will consist of one third to one fifth previously soured milk.

Camel milk will not sour for up to 72 hours at temperatures below 10 °C (50 °F). At 30 °C (86 °F) the milk sours in approximately 8 hours (compared to cow's milk, which sours within 3 hours).

A comparison of the composition of camel milk and camel chal:

Dornic acidic degrees are used to describe acidity in milk products, with 1 Dornic degree (1°D) is equal to 0.1g of lactic acid per liter. The chal contained Lactobacilli lactic; streptococci and yeast.

Chal may be cultured with lactobacillus casei, streptococcus thermophilus and lactose-fermenting yeasts incubating in inoculated milk for 8 hours at 25 °C (77 °F), and then subsequently for 16 hours at 20 °C (68 °F). Holder pasteurization does not affect the quality of the milk, but pasteurization at higher temperatures ( 85 °C/185 °F) for 5 minutes negatively impacts flavour. Chal made from pure cultures of lactobacillus casei, streptococcus thermophilus and species of torula has markedly less not-fat solids and lactose than the milk from which it is made.

See also
Ayran
Borhani
Cuisine of Kazakhstan
 List of yogurt-based dishes and beverages

References

External links

Filip Noubel, "Golden Century of the Turkmens:" A Bleak Picture of Village Life in the Desert. EurasiaNet photo essay, 10/25/02

Kazakhstani cuisine
Turkish cuisine
Yogurt-based drinks
Turkish words and phrases
Turkmenistan cuisine
Uzbekistani cuisine
Fermented drinks
Camel products